One Who Walked Alone: Robert E. Howard, The Final Years is a memoir of Robert E. Howard by Novalyne Price Ellis. Donald M. Grant, Publisher, Inc. published the book in 1986 with an edition of 800 copies.  The book was adapted into the film The Whole Wide World in 1996.  Grant has reprinted the book four times: 1988 (550 copies),  1998 (500 copies) and twice more. Starting with the third printing, the dust jacket was changed to include a picture of Renée Zellweger from her role in The Whole Wide World.

References

1986 non-fiction books
Biographies about writers
American biographies
Books about Robert E. Howard
Donald M. Grant, Publisher books